Miracle is the only studio album by American singer Puff Johnson. It was released by The Work Group on May 28, 1996 in the United States. Johnson worked with a broadranging cast of producers and songwriters on her debut, including Narada Michael Walden, Tim & Bob, Jermaine Dupri, Walter Afanasieff, Dan Shea, and Keith Thomas, and co-wrote seven of the set's twelve tracks. Their collaborations led to eclectic material on Miracle, which borrowed from an assortment of genres, combining contemporary R&B with pop, jazz, fusion and G-funk.

The album earned mixed to positive reviews from music critics, many of whom praised Johnson's vocal performances but found the material uneven. Upon release, it peaked at number seven on the Norwegian Albums Chart and entered the top thirty in the Netherlands. In the US, it reached number 61 on Billboards Top R&B/Hip-Hop Albums only. Miracle spawned three singles, including the top five hit "Forever More" and follow-up "All Over Your Face" as well as "Over and Over" which had first appeared on the soundtrack of the American comedy film The First Wives Club (1996).

Critical reception
Deborah Gregory, writing for Vibe, found that "while Miracle doesn't quite live up to the loftiness of its title — due to the saccharine melodies and middle-of-the-road material — there's no doubt about [Johnson's] pipes. This 23-year-old angel can croon [...] The cuts that provide the freshest foil for Johnson's pitch-perfect voice are  "All Over Your Face" and "True Meaning of Love." Both of these silky R&B grooves are better than the predictable pining of first single "Forever More."

Track listing

Notes
 denotes associate producer
 denotes co-producer
Samples
"Outside My Window" contains a sample from "What's Going On" as performed by Marvin Gaye.
"All Because of You" contains a sample of "Hip Hop vs. Rap" as performed by KRS-One.

Charts

References

1996 debut albums
Albums produced by Tim & Bob
Albums produced by Jermaine Dupri
Albums produced by Narada Michael Walden
Albums produced by Walter Afanasieff
Contemporary R&B albums by American artists
Columbia Records albums